Reid Watts (born December 22, 1998) is a Canadian luger.

Career

2015–2016 season
Watts won the bronze medal in the boys' singles event at the second Winter Youth Olympics in Lillehammer, Norway.

2017–2018 season
In December 2017, Watts was named to Canada's Olympic team for the 2018 Winter Olympics in Pyeongchang, South Korea.

2022 Olympics
In January 2022, Watts was named to Canada's 2022 Olympic team.

References

External links
 

1998 births
Canadian male lugers
Living people
Lugers at the 2018 Winter Olympics
Lugers at the 2022 Winter Olympics
Olympic lugers of Canada
Lugers at the 2016 Winter Youth Olympics
Youth Olympic bronze medalists for Canada